Concrete ships are built of steel and ferrocement (reinforced concrete) instead of more traditional materials, such as steel or wood. The advantage of ferrocement construction is that materials are cheap and readily available, while the disadvantages are that construction labor costs are high, as are operating costs. (Ferrocement ships require thick hulls, which results in either a larger cross-sectional area that hurts hydrodynamics, or leaves less space for cargo.) During the late 19th century, there were concrete river barges in Europe, and during both World War I and World War II, steel shortages led the US military to order the construction of small fleets of ocean-going concrete ships, the largest of which was the SS Selma. United States Maritime Administration (MARAD) designation for concrete ships-barges was Type B ship. Few concrete ships were completed in time to see wartime service during World War I, but during 1944 and 1945, concrete ships and barges were used to support U.S. and British invasions in Europe and the Pacific. Since the late 1930s, there have also been ferrocement pleasure boats.

History

The oldest known ferrocement watercraft was a dinghy built by Joseph-Louis Lambot in Southern France in 1848. Lambot's boat was featured in the Exposition Universelle held in Paris in 1855.

Beginning in the 1860s, ferrocement barges were built in Europe for use on canals, and around 1896, an Italian engineer, Carlo Gabellini, began building small ships out of ferrocement. The most famous of his ships was the Liguria.

Between 1908 and 1914, larger ferrocement barges began to be made in Germany, United Kingdom, the Netherlands, Norway and United States. The remains of a British ship of this type, the auxiliary coaster Violette (built 1919), can be seen at Hoo, Kent, England.

On August 2, 1917, Nicolay Fougner of Norway launched the first self-propelled ferrocement ship intended for ocean travel. This was an  vessel of 400 tons named Namsenfjord. With the success of this ship, additional ferrocement vessels were ordered, and in October 1917, the U.S. government invited Fougner to head a study into the feasibility of building ferrocement ships in the United States. The Fougner Concrete Shipbuilding Company, Flushing Bay, New York, reported calculated cost was of $290 per deadweight ton for the Cape Fear (List of shipwrecks in 1920 "10.21 30 October") and the Sapona which they presumably built.

About the same time, the California businessman W. Leslie Comyn took the initiative to build ferrocement ships on his own. Faith was launched March 18, 1918. She cost $750,000 to build. She was used to carry bulk cargo for trade until 1921, when she was sold and scrapped as a breakwater in Cuba.

On April 12, 1918, President Woodrow Wilson approved the Emergency Fleet Corporation program which oversaw the construction of 24 ferrocement ships for the war. However, when the war ended in November 1918, only 12 ferrocement ships were under construction and none of them had been completed. These 12 ships were eventually completed, but soon sold to private companies who used them for light-trading, storage, and scrap.

Other countries that looked into ferrocement ship construction during this period included Canada, Denmark, Italy, Spain, Sweden and the United Kingdom.

Between the world wars, there was little commercial or military interest in concrete ship construction. The reason was that other shipbuilding methods were cheaper and less labor-intensive, and other kinds of ships were cheaper to operate. However, in 1942, after the U.S. entered World War II, the U.S. military found that its contractors had steel shortages. Consequently, the U.S. government contracted McCloskey & Company of Philadelphia, Pennsylvania to build 24 self-propelled concrete ships. Construction started in July 1943. The shipyard was at Hookers Point in Tampa, Florida, and at its peak, it employed 6,000 workers. The U.S. government also contracted with two companies in California for the construction of concrete barge ships. Barge ships were large vessels that lacked engines to propel them. Instead, they were towed by tugs.

In Europe, ferrocement barges (FCBs) played a crucial role in World War II operations, particularly in the D-Day Normandy landings, where they were used as part of the Mulberry harbour defenses, for fuel and munitions transportation, as blockships, and as floating pontoons. In 1940, 200 were commissioned to serve as petrol-carrying barges. The barges weighed 160 tons and were constructed on the London dockside before being craned into the water by a giant crane.

Some barges were fitted with engines and used as mobile canteens and troop carriers. Some of these vessels survive as abandoned wrecks or sea defenses (against storm surges) in the Thames Estuary including near Rainham Marshes.) Two remain in civil use as moorings at Westminster. 

One notable wartime FCB, previously beached at Canvey Island, was partially removed in 2003 by the local sailing club, whose land it was on, for fear it was a "danger to children". Local historians disagreed with the club and were displeased with their actions.

In 1944 a concrete firm in California proposed a submarine shaped freighter which they claimed could achieve speeds of 75 knots. The war ended any more research into the project. In retrospect many believe the claims were greatly overstated.

Concrete barges also served in the Pacific during 1944 and 1945. From the Charleroi, Pennsylvania, Mail, February 5, 1945:

One concrete barge under tow by Jicarilla (ATF-104) was lost off Saipan during a typhoon, and another barge damaged the Moreton Bay Pile Light in Brisbane, but the rest served admirably.

Today

Modern hobbyists also build ferrocement boats, as their construction methods do not require special tools, and the materials are comparatively cheap. A pioneer in this movement is Hartley Boats, which has been selling plans for concrete boats since 1938. Meanwhile, since the 1960s, the American Society of Civil Engineers has sponsored the National Concrete Canoe Competition.

In Europe, especially the Netherlands, concrete is still used to build some of the barges on which houseboats are built.

Remaining wartime ships 
Surviving wartime concrete ships are no longer in use as ships. Several continue in use in various forms, mostly as museums or breakwaters.

North America 
The largest collection is at Powell River, British Columbia, where a lumber mill uses ten floating ferrocement ships as a breakwater.

The Kiptopeke Breakwater in Chesapeake Bay, Virginia, is formed by nine sunken concrete ships built in World War II.

, a former oil tanker, lies off the coast of Cayo Las Brujas, Cuba, where it served as a hotel, then as a base for divers. Currently, the San Pasqual is abandoned.

The tanker  is located northwest of the fishing pier at Seawolf Park in Galveston, . The ship was launched the same day Germany signed the Treaty of Versailles, ending the war, so it never saw wartime duty and instead was used as an oil tanker in the Gulf of Mexico.

The , a concrete tanker launched on May 29, 1919, was purchased and turned into an amusement pier, and is still visible at Seacliff State Beach, near Aptos, California, . It broke up during a January 2017 storm.

The wreck is periodically exposed by strong storm tides.

The vessel aground in the surf at Shipwreck Beach on the north shore of Lanai, Hawaii is the wreck of YOG-42, a concrete gasoline barge built for the US Navy in 1942 and placed in service in 1943. The wreck is often misidentified as a Liberty ship.

It is a popular snorkeling site and boating landmark in the area.

Europe 
One of the few concrete ships built for but not completed in time to be used in World War I, the SS Crete Boom, lies abandoned in the River Moy,  just outside the town of Ballina, County Mayo, Ireland, and is considered of much interest to the area's many tourists. 

A concrete barge, the Cretetree, is beached in the harbour of the Isle of Scalpay near Tarbert, Harris, Scotland, . It was built by Aberdeen Concrete Ships, and completed in 1919.

The Purton Hulks, a collection of vessels intentionally beached at Purton during the first half of the twentieth century as a method to prevent coastal erosion, includes eight ferro-concrete barges. 

A large collection of abandoned concrete barges are seen at River Thames in Rainham, London. 

It was sunk during a Soviet air raid on 20 March 1945. In the late 1950s Polish authorities decided to lift it and tow it to another location to be converted into swimming pools, but during that operation it began sinking again, so it was abandoned in shallow water, where it has remained since.

 

During the German occupation of Greece (1942–1944) during World War II, the German Army built 24 concrete cargo vessels for transporting goods to various Greek islands, including Crete. These were constructed in the Perama shipbuilding area of Piraeus. After the war, many of the vessels were used as piers (e.g., in Rafina) and breakwaters (e.g., in Agios Georgios, Methana).

Due to the need to deliver necessary raw materials (such as oil, weapons, ammunition, food and drugs) through mined river currents, Adolf Hitler ordered the production of 50 concrete ships for different purposes. Most were concrete barges made for oil transportation from Romania, and needed raw materials that were driven to the Baltic front. A smaller number of ships was intended for transporting food (specializing in cold storages). The most valuable ships were the specialized ship-hospitals, which evacuated seriously wounded and "important" soldiers to German hospitals along rivers.

Japan 
Several concrete ships were aground on the west beach of Iwo To (Iwo Jima) in Japan, to make a breakwater by the US forces in 1945. Most of them were broken by typhoons but one was used as a pier.

Japan built four concrete ships named Takechi Maru No. 1 to 4 during World War II. After the war, two of them turned into a breakwater in Kure, Hiroshima, .

See also
Concrete canoe
Capella (concrete ship)
Concrete Ship, former concrete hospital ship
Trefoil class concrete barge

References

External links 

History of ferro-concrete ships
Comprehensive list of ferro-concrete builders
Images of concrete vessels from the National Monuments Record  Photographic record of the construction and launch of the Cretemanor at Preston and the Seacraft Concrete Co on the Mersey.
"Pour in the Concrete and Take Out a Ship", February 1919 Popular Science
 "How Pour Ships Are Made" , June 1943, Popular Science

 
Ship types
Concrete
Barges